The 1976 Louisiana Tech Bulldogs football team was an American football team that represented Louisiana Tech University as a member of the Southland Conference during the 1976 NCAA Division I football season. In their tenth year under head coach Maxie Lambright, the team compiled a 6–5 record.

Schedule

References

Louisiana Tech
Louisiana Tech Bulldogs football seasons
Louisiana Tech Bulldogs football